Robert Carteret, 3rd Earl Granville, 3rd Baron Carteret, MP (1721–1776) was a Member of Parliament for Yarmouth (1744–1747) and hereditary Bailiff of Jersey from (1763–1776).

Early life 
Robert Carteret, born in 1721 and was the son of John Carteret, 2nd Earl Granville, who was the Lord President of the Council and Frances Worsley, daughter of Sir Robert Worsley, 4th Baronet.

He was educated at Westminster School (1731–1738) and St John's College (1738).

Parliament 
Carteret in April 1744 tried to become the candidate for Cornwall, but was unsuccessful. He instead would run to be the Member of Parliament for Yarmouth during a by-election in 1744, he would not run for re-election after his term.

Marriage 
He married a French girl named Elizabeth (died 1766); however, they did not have any issue.

Americas 
Carteret, due to his inheritance from his father and his Royalist great-great-grandfather Sir George Carteret, owned vast territories in the Province of Carolina. After the outbreak of rebellion, Carteret would refuse to sell the land. After his death in 1776 his nephew Henry Carteret, 1st Baron Carteret would inherit the land; however, as a result of the American Revolutionary War all land of those who supported the British was seized by the State. The British government would give compensation for the lost land.

Ancestry

References 

1721 births
1776 deaths
Bailiffs of Jersey
Members of the Parliament of the United Kingdom for English constituencies
03